Joseph Bernard (1866, Vienne, Isère – 1931) was a modern classical French sculptor, featured on the frontispiece of Elie Faure's 1927 survey of modern art, "Spirit of Forms".  Bernard was trained at the École des Beaux-Arts in the atelier of Pierre-Jules Cavelier.

Gallery

External links 

Web gallery of 20th Century figure sculpture
 

1866 births
1931 deaths
People from Vienne, Isère
20th-century French sculptors
20th-century French male artists
19th-century French sculptors
19th-century French male artists
French male sculptors